Franz Czuk is an Austrian para-alpine skier. He represented Austria in alpine skiing at the 1994 Winter Paralympics.

He won the silver medal in the Men's Giant Slalom B1 event.

He also competed in the Men's Super-G B1 event but did not finish.

See also 
 List of Paralympic medalists in alpine skiing

References 

Living people
Year of birth missing (living people)
Place of birth missing (living people)
Paralympic alpine skiers of Austria
Alpine skiers at the 1994 Winter Paralympics
Medalists at the 1994 Winter Paralympics
Paralympic silver medalists for Austria
Paralympic medalists in alpine skiing